Kober is a German surname. Notable people with the surname include:

Adolf Kober (1879–1958), German rabbi and medievalist
Alice Kober (1906–1950), American classical scholar and archaeologist
Amelie Kober (born 1987), German snowboarder
Andrew Kober (born 1984), American actor
Annegret Kober (born 1957), German backstroke swimmer
Arthur Kober (1900–1975), American humorist, author, press agent, and screenwriter
Avi Kober (born 1950), Israeli professor and political studies researcher
Axel Kober (born 1970), German conductor
Birgit Kober (born 1971), German Paralympic athlete
Carsten Kober (born 1967), German footballer
Claire Kober (born 1978), English politician
Franz Kober (born 1956), German engineer (cinema)
Franz Quirin von Kober (1821–1897), German Roman Catholic priest
Herman Kober (1888–1973), German mathematician
Ingo Kober (born 1942), former president of the European Patent Office
Jeff Kober (born 1953), American actor
Lars Kober (born 1976), German flatwater canoer
Leopold Kober (1883–1970), Austrian geologist
Martin Kober (fl. late 17th century), Polish court painter
Noémie Kober (born 1979), French rower
Ofer Kober (born 1975), Israeli translator
Pascal Kober (born 1971), German politician
Sebastian Köber (born 1993), German boxer
Shahar Kober (born 1979), Israeli illustrator
Theodor Kober (1865–1930), German aviation engineer
Umberto Kober (born 1974), Brazilian chemist

German-language surnames
Surnames from given names